Crime & Punishment is a 2002 reality television, nontraditional court show spin-off of the Law & Order franchise. It premiered on NBC on June 16, 2002, and ran through the summers of 2002, 2003, and 2004. The show was produced by Bill Guttentag, who won an Academy Award for his documentary You Don't Have to Die.

Description

The series goes inside the District Attorney's office of San Diego County, California, as they prepared and tried cases. It involved going behind the scenes with the prosecutors as they prepared for the trial and provided three-camera coverage of the courtroom. Crime & Punishment has been described as a cross between a drama and a documentary or "docudrama". The series was created and executive produced by Wolf, along with Academy Award-winning documentary filmmaker Bill Guttentag. David J. Kanter is co-creator and executive producer, and follows prosecutors from the San Diego County District Attorney’s office as they investigate and try cases, while viewers see the drama unfold from real-life victims, prosecutors, family members and defendants.

The main theme was a remix of the Law & Order theme.

Episode list

Season 1: 2002
 "People v. Dailey" / 2002.06.16
 "People v. Jones" / 2002.06.23
 "People v. Vasquez" / 2002.06.30
 "People v. Sanabria" / 2002.07.07
 "People v. Curry" / 2002.07.14
 "People v. Scheirbaum & People v. Villa" / 2002.07.21
 "People v. Taitano" / 2002.07.28
 "People v. Garcia" / 2002.08.04
 "People v. Kayser & People v. Palomino" / 2002.08.11
 "People v. Wells" / 2002.08.18
 "People v. Scott & People v. Smith" / 2002.08.25
 "People v. Mayta" / 2002.09.01
 "People v. Redondo" / Air date unknown

Season 2: 2003
 "People v. Richard Arnold" / 2003.06.01
 "People v. Ron Barker/NY Nourn" / 2003.06.08
 "People v. Clifford Smith" / 2003.06.15
 "People v. Emile Robershaw" / 2003.06.22
 "People v. Joseph Villarino" / 2003.06.29
 "People v. Hugo Alcazar" / 2003.07.06
 "People v. Delia Contreras" / 2003.07.13

Season 3: 2004
 "People v. George Waller Jr. & Lawrence Calhoun" / 2004.06.12
 "People v. Brenda Cook & People v. Lawrence Marsh" / 2004.06.19
 "People v. Bernard Cutts" / 2004.06.26
 "People v. Terry Hall" / 2004.07.03
 "People v. McPherson, Bubeck & People v. Chastang" / 2004.07.10
 "People v. Tianna Thomas & People v. Charles Mambane" / 2004.07.17

References

External links 
 
 

Law & Order (franchise)
NBC original programming
American television spin-offs
Court shows
2000s American reality television series
2002 American television series debuts
2004 American television series endings
Television series created by Dick Wolf
Television series by Wolf Films
Television series by Universal Television
Television series about prosecutors